Allodapella is a genus of moths belonging to the subfamily Olethreutinae of the family Tortricidae.

Species
Allodapella daemonia Diakonoff, 1948

See also
List of Tortricidae genera

References

External links
tortricidae.com

Monotypic moth genera
Eucosmini
Tortricidae genera
Taxa named by Alexey Diakonoff